Crni Vrh (Serbian Cyrillic: Црни врх) is a mountain in southwestern Serbia, above the town of Priboj.

References

Mountains of Serbia